CU London is a Higher Education institute owned and governed by Coventry University. CU London began offering courses to students in September 2017. It currently operates out of two sites, one in the former Dagenham Civic Centre in the London Borough of Barking and Dagenham and another in the Mitre Passage building in the Greenwich Peninsula. It includes Coventry University's second and third campuses in the capital alongside Coventry University London.

Subjects 
CU London offers a range of subjects across Foundation, HNC, HND and degree level, which students can study full-time or part-time on evenings or weekends. Subjects offered by CU London include:

 Applied Biosciences
 Applied Psychology
 Business Management & Leadership
 Computing Science
 Cyber Security
 Early Childhood Development & Learning
 Electro-Mechanical Engineering
 Health & Social Care
 Law & Practice
 Marketing & Public Relations
Oil, Gas & Energy Management
 Primary Education & Teaching Studies
 Professional Accounting
 Professional Policing
 Public Health & Community Studies
 Sport & Leisure Management
 Tourism & Hospitality Management

Community work 
Beyond its work teaching on undergraduate courses, CU London has continued to use its campus, the former Dagenham Civic Centre building, as a hub for community events. This has included the Annual Conference of the All Women’s Network and Run4Life.

CU London has also developed a range of bursaries and funding sources for young people and teachers in the London Borough of Barking and Dagenham. The CU London Open Bursary Fund offers additional tutoring in maths and English and a £10,000 donation was made to the Colin Pond Trust Fund to provide extra financial help across local schools.

References 

London
Further education colleges in London
Education in the London Borough of Barking and Dagenham
2017 establishments in the United Kingdom